The Green Revolution was a period that began in the 1960s during which agriculture in India was converted into a modern industrial system by the adoption of technology, such as the use of high yielding variety (HYV) seeds, mechanised farm tools, irrigation facilities, pesticides and fertilizers. Mainly led by agricultural scientist M. S. Swaminathan in India, this period was part of the larger Green Revolution endeavor initiated by Norman E Borlaug, which leveraged agricultural research and technology to increase agricultural productivity in the developing world.

Under premiership of Congress leaders Lal Bahadur Shastri and Indira Gandhi, the Green Revolution within India commenced in 1968, leading to an increase in food grain production, especially in Punjab, Haryana, and Uttar Pradesh. Major milestones in this undertaking were the development of high-yielding varieties of wheat, and rust resistant strains of wheat. The long-term effects of green revolution have been analysed by environmentalists like Vandana Shiva and others who say that it caused greater environmental, financial and sociological problems like droughts, rural indebtedness and farmer suicides. Reports have shown soil deterioration from the use of chemicals which has led to the collapse of agricultural systems in many regions of the country, and negatively affected the farmers, food and water supply.

Notable figures and institutions 

A number of people have been recognized for their efforts during India's Green Revolution.

 M. S. Swaminathan, the main architect or the Father of the Green Revolution in India.
 Chidambaram Subramaniam, the food and agriculture minister at the time, a Bharat Ratna, has been called the Political Father of the Green Revolution. 
 Dilbagh Singh Athwal, is called the Father of Wheat Revolution.
Scientists such as Atmaram Bhairav Joshi.
Institutions such as Indian Agricultural Research Institute (IARI).

Practices

Wheat production 
The main development was higher-yielding varieties of wheat, for developing rust resistant strains of wheat. The introduction of high-yielding varieties (HYV) of seeds and the improved quality of fertilizers and irrigation techniques led to the increase in the production to make the country self-sufficient in food grains, thus improving agriculture in India. Also, other varieties such as Kalyan Sona and Sonalika were introduced by cross breeding of wheat with other crops. The methods adopted included the use of high-yielding varieties (HYVs) of seeds with modern farming methods.

The production of wheat has produced the best results in fueling self-sufficiency of India. Along with high-yielding seeds and irrigation facilities, the enthusiasm of farmers mobilized the idea of agricultural revolution. Due to the rise in use of chemical pesticides and fertilizers, there was a negative effect on the soil and the land (e.g., land degradation).

Other practices 
The other practices include high-yielding varieties (HYVs) of seeds, Irrigation infrastructure, use of pesticides, insecticides and herbicides, consolidation of holdings, land reforms, improved rural infrastructure, supply of agricultural credit, use of chemical or synthetic fertilizers, use of sprinklers or drip irrigation systems and use of advanced machinery.

Rationale for the Green Revolution 
The Green Revolution in India was first introduced in Punjab in the late 1966-67 as part of a development program issued by international donor agencies and the Government of India.

During the British Raj, India's grain economy hinged on a unilateral relation of exploitation. Consequently, when India gained independence, the weakened country quickly became vulnerable to frequent famines, financial instabilities, and low productivity. These factors formed a rationale for the implementation of the Green Revolution as a development strategy in India.

 Frequent famines: In 1964–65 and 1965–66, India experienced two severe droughts which led to food shortages and famines among the country's growing population. Modern agricultural technologies appeared to offer strategies to counter the frequency of famines. There is debate regarding India's famines prior to independence, with some arguing they were intensified by British taxation and agrarian policies in the 19th and 20th centuries, and others downplaying such impact of colonial rule.
 Lack of finance: Marginal farmers found it very difficult to get finance and credit at economical rates from the government and banks and hence, fell as easy prey to the money lenders. They took loans from landlords, who charged high rates of interests and also exploited the farmers later on to work in their fields to repay the loans (farm labourers). Proper financing was not given during the Green Revolution period, which created a lot of problems and sufferings to the farmers of India. The government also helped those under loans.
 Low productivity: In the context of India's rapidly growing population, the country's traditional agricultural practices yielded insufficient food production. By the 1960s, this low productivity led India to experience food grain shortages that were more severe than those of other developing countries. Agricultural technological advancements offered opportunities to increase productivity.

Criticism 
The Green Revolution yielded great economic prosperity during its early years. In Punjab, where it was first introduced, the Green Revolution led to significant increases in the state's agricultural output, supporting India's overall economy. By 1970, Punjab was producing 70% of the country's total food grains, and farmers' incomes were increasing by over 70%. Punjab's prosperity following the Green Revolution became a model to which other states aspired to reach.

However, despite the initial prosperity experienced in Punjab, the Green Revolution was met with much controversy throughout India.

Indian economic sovereignty(negative impact) 
Criticism on the effects of the green revolution include the cost for many small farmers using HYV seeds, with their associated demands of increased irrigation systems and pesticides. A case study is found in India, where farmers are buying Monsanto BT cotton seeds—sold on the idea that these seeds produced 'non natural insecticides'. In reality, they still had to pay for expensive pesticides and irrigation systems, which led to increased borrowing to finance the change from traditional seed varieties. Many farmers had difficulty in paying for the expensive technologies, especially if they had a bad harvest. These high costs of cultivation pushed rural farmers to take out loans—typically at high interest rates. Over-borrowing  entrapped the farmers into a cycle of debt.

India's liberalized economy further exacerbated the farmers' economic conditions. Indian environmentalist Vandana Shiva writes that this is the "second Green Revolution". The first Green Revolution, she suggests, was mostly publicly funded (by the Indian Government). This new Green Revolution, she says, is driven by private (and foreign) interest—notably MNCs like Monsanto—as encouraged by Neoliberalism. Ultimately, this is leading to foreign ownership over most of India's farmland, undermining farmers' interests.

Farmer's financial issues have become especially apparent in Punjab, where its rural areas have witnessed an alarming rise in suicide rates. Excluding the countless unreported cases, there has been estimated to be a 51.97% increase in the number of suicides in Punjab in 1992–93, compared to the recorded 5.11% increase in the country as a whole. According to a 2019 Indian news report, indebtedness continues to be a grave issue affecting the people of Punjab today, demonstrated by the more than 900 recorded farmer committed suicide in Punjab in the last two years.

Environmental damage 
Excessive and inappropriate use of fertilizers and pesticides polluted waterways and killed beneficial insects and wildlife. It has caused over-use of soil and rapidly depleted its nutrients. The rampant irrigation practices led to eventual soil degradation. Groundwater practices have fallen dramatically. Further, heavy dependence on few major crops has led to loss of biodiversity of farmers, and the increase of stubble burning cases since 1980. These problems were aggravated due to absence of training to use modern technology and vast illiteracy leading to excessive use of chemicals.

Increased regional disparities 
The green revolution spread only in irrigated and high-potential rainfed areas. The villages or regions without the access of sufficient water were left out that widened the regional disparities between adopters and non-adopters. Since, the HYV seeds technically can be applied only in a land with assured water supply and availability of other inputs like chemicals, fertilizers etc. The application of the new technology in the dry-land areas is simply ruled out.

The states like Punjab, Haryana, Uttar Pradesh, etc. having good irrigation and other infrastructure facilities were able to derive the benefits of the green revolution and achieve faster economic development while other states have recorded slow growth in agriculture production.

Alternative farming methods 

In the years since Green Revolution was adopted, issues of sustainability have come up due to the adverse environmental and social impacts. To meet this challenge other alternatives of farming have emerged like small subsistence farms, family homesteads, New Age communes, village and community farming collectives and women’s cooperatives with the common purpose of producing organically grown, chemical free food. In green revolution areas of the country increasing numbers of families are experimenting on their own with alternative systems of land management and the growing of crops. Building upon the idea of sustainable development, commercial models for large scale food production have been developed by integrating traditional farming systems with appropropriate energy efficient technology.

References

Further reading 
Chakravarti, A.K. 1973. "Green Revolution in India" in Annals of the Association of American Geographers 63 (September 1973): 319-30.
Frankel, Francine R. 1971. India’s Green Revolution: Economic Gains and Political Costs. Princeton: Princeton University Press.
Gill, Monohar Singh. 1983. "The Development of Punjab Agriculture, 1977-80." Asian Survey 23 (July 1983):830-44.
Ladejinsky, Wolf. 1970. "Ironies of India’s Green Revolution". Foreign Affairs no. 4.  (July 1970): 758-68.
Parayil, Govindan. 1992. "The Green Revolution in India: A Case Study in Technological Change," Technology and Culture 33 (October 1992): 737-56.
Saha, Madhumita. "The State, Scientists, and Staple Crops: Agricultural 'Modernization' in Pre-Green Revolution India." Agricultural History 87 (Spring 2003):201-23
Sebby, Kathryn. 2010. "The Green Revolution of the 1960's and Its Impact on Small Farmers in India [PDF." Environmental Studies Undergraduate Student Theses 10.
Sen, Bandhudas. 1974. The Green Revolution in India: A Perspective. New York: John Wiley & Sons.

Agricultural revolutions
History of agriculture in India
Intensive farming
History of the Republic of India
Economic history of India
Indira Gandhi administration
History of Punjab, India (1947–present)